This is a list of the Knights (men) and Members (women) of the Royal Order of the Seraphim:

Color pattern

Sweden

Royal family of Sweden

Notable Swedish historical figures

Frederick I of Sweden (1748–51)

Adolf Frederick of Sweden (1751–71)

Gustav III of Sweden (1771–92)

Gustav IV Adolf of Sweden (1792–1809)

Charles XIII of Sweden (1809–18)

Charles XIV John of Sweden (1818–44)

Oscar I of Sweden (1844–59)

Charles XV of Sweden (1859–72)

Oscar II of Sweden (1872–1907)

Gustaf V of Sweden (1907–50)

Gustaf VI Adolf of Sweden (1950–73)

Carl XVI Gustaf of Sweden (1973–) 

The Royal Order of the Seraphim was revised in 1975. Since then, the order is only open to foreign heads of state and members of royal families.

Europe

Austria

Belgium

Bulgaria

Denmark

Estonia

Finland

France

Germany

Prussia - 2nd Empire of Germany

Components of the Empire of Germany

Modern Germany

Greece

Hungary

Iceland

Italy

Latvia

Lithuania

Luxembourg

Monaco

Netherlands

Norway

Poland

Portugal

Romania

Russia

Serbia

Slovakia

Spain

Turkey

Ottoman Empire

Republic of Turkey

United Kingdom

Yugoslavia

Americas

Argentina

Brazil

Chile

Mexico

Africa

Egypt

Ethiopia

Liberia

South Africa

Tanzania

Tunisia

Asia - Middle East

Iran

Jordan

Saudi Arabia

Asia - Far East

Brunei

Bhutan

China

Indonesia

Japan

Malaysia

South Korea

Thailand

See also 
 List of current Knights of the Royal Order of the Seraphim

Sources 
 Per Nordenvall, Kungliga Serafimerorden 1748-1998 (1998)

References 

 
Seraphim